This is an episode guide for Thunderbirds, a British Supermarionation television series produced by AP Films (later named Century 21 Productions) from 1964 and first broadcast on the ITV network in 1965 and 1966. It lists both the TV episodes and the 1960s audio plays by Century 21 Records, along with their adaptations.

Two feature film sequels to the TV series were released in 1966 and 1968, followed by three made-for-TV compilation films in the early 1980s. In 2015, a mini-series based on the three original audio stories was produced to mark the series' 50th anniversary.

All TV episodes were released on Region 2 DVD by Carlton in 2000 and 2001. A Region 1 box set by A&E Home Video followed in 2002. The episodes were released on Blu-ray Disc in 2008.

Television series

Series 1
Series 1 of Thunderbirds comprised 26 episodes, each approximately 50 minutes long. Episodes are listed in the official order published by distributor ITC Entertainment, which matches the order of production.

Series 2
Series 2 comprised six 50-minute episodes.  Episodes are listed in the official order published by distributor ITC Entertainment, which matches the order of production.

Audio episodes
Between 1965 and 1967, Century 21 Records released 19 Thunderbirds audio plays in the form of 7-inch, 33 RPM vinyl EP records (promoted as "mini-albums"), each about 21 minutes long. Three of these were original stories; the rest were retellings of selected TV episodes, each condensed from the original soundtrack with added narration by one of the main characters. In 1990, revised versions of eight plays were broadcast as a mini-series on BBC Radio 5.

Of the original stories, voice actors Peter Dyneley, David Graham and Sylvia Anderson featured in all three, Ray Barrett in two and Shane Rimmer in one. Two of the storiesF.A.B. and The Stately Homes Robberieswere told from the point of view of Lady Penelope and Parker, and featured original music by Barry Gray. In 2015, the stories were adapted as screen episodes to mark Thunderbirds 50th anniversary.

Film sequels and compilations

Feature films
Two Thunderbirds feature films were released in the 1960s. The events of the first film, Thunderbirds Are Go, precede those of the final TV episode, "Give or Take a Million".

Compilation films
Between 1980 and 1982, three compilation films were produced. Released on VHS by PolyGram and its subsidiary Channel 5 Video, each of these was made up of re-edited versions of two TV episodes.

The Anniversary Episodes
In 2015, to mark Thunderbirds 50th anniversary, ITV commissioned Pod 4 Films to produce a mini-series of new episodes based on the original audio stories from the 1960s. Funding was raised through Kickstarter and the production team included some of the original Thunderbirds crew. The adaptation of "The Stately Homes Robberies" was directed by David Elliott, making it his first new episode of Thunderbirds in 49 years.

The mini-series had a premiere screening at the BFI Southbank in 2016 and was subsequently released on DVD and Blu-ray Disc to its Kickstarter backers. Titled The Anniversary Episodes, it was added to BritBox in 2020.

See also

Lists of Thunderbirds home video releases

References

Works cited

External links

Series 1 and Series 2 episode lists on the Fanderson website
The Secretive Busa tongue-in-cheek episode guide at thevervoid.com

Lists of British action television series episodes
Lists of British children's television series episodes
Lists of British science fiction television series episodes
 
Wikipedia articles containing unlinked shortened footnotes